is a railway station in Itoshima, Fukuoka Prefecture, Japan. It is operated by JR Kyushu and is on the Chikuhi Line.

Lines
Both local and rapid services on the Chikuhi Line stop at this station.

Station layout 
The station consists of two island platforms serving four tracks. The station building is a modern hashigami structure where the station facilities are located on a bridge spanning the platforms and which has entrances north and south of the tracks. On the bridge are a waiting room, a shop and a ticket counter. After the ticket gates on the bridge, escalators descend to the two island platforms.

The ticket counter is staffed JR Kyushu directly and is equipped with a Midori no Madoguchi facility.

Platforms

Adjacent stations

History
By 1 April 1924, the line had been extended east with the station, then named Maebaru opening as the new eastern terminus. When the Kitakyushu Railway was nationalized on 1 October 1937, Japanese Government Railways (JGR) took over control of the station and renamed it Chikuzen-Maebaru and designated the line which served it as the Chikuhi Line. With the privatization of Japanese National Railways (JNR), the successor of JGR, on 1 April 1987, control of the station passed to JR Kyushu.

Passenger statistics
In fiscal 2016, the station was used by an average of 7,353 passengers daily (boarding passengers only), and it ranked 24th among the busiest stations of JR Kyushu.

See also
 List of railway stations in Japan

References

External links
Chikuzen-Maebaru Station (JR Kyushu)

Railway stations in Japan opened in 1924
Chikuhi Line
Railway stations in Fukuoka Prefecture
Stations of Kyushu Railway Company